Admiral Hipper was the lead ship of the  of heavy cruisers which served with Nazi Germany's Kriegsmarine during World War II. The ship was laid down at the Blohm & Voss shipyard in Hamburg in July 1935 and launched February 1937; Admiral Hipper entered service shortly before the outbreak of war, in April 1939. The ship was named after Admiral Franz von Hipper, commander of the German battlecruiser squadron during the Battle of Jutland in 1916 and later commander-in-chief of the German High Seas Fleet.

Admiral Hipper saw a significant amount of action during the war, notably present during the Battle of the Atlantic. She led the assault on Trondheim during Operation Weserübung; while en route to her objective, she sank the British destroyer . In December 1940, she broke out into the Atlantic Ocean to operate against Allied merchant shipping, though this operation ended without significant success. In February 1941, Admiral Hipper sortied again, sinking several merchant vessels before eventually returning to Germany via the Denmark Strait.

Disappointed by the failure to sink merchant ships in that battle, Adolf Hitler ordered the majority of the surface warships scrapped, though Admiral Karl Dönitz was able to persuade Hitler to retain the surface fleet. As a result, Admiral Hipper was returned to Germany and decommissioned for repairs. The ship was never restored to operational status, however, and on 3 May 1945, Royal Air Force bombers severely damaged her while she was in Kiel, Germany. Her crew scuttled the ship at her moorings, and in July 1945, she was raised and towed to Heikendorfer Bay. She was ultimately broken up for scrap in 1948–1952; her bell is currently on display at the Laboe Naval Memorial near Kiel.

Design 

The  of heavy cruisers was ordered in the context of German naval rearmament after the Nazi Party came to power in 1933 and repudiated the disarmament clauses of the Treaty of Versailles. In 1935, Germany signed the Anglo–German Naval Agreement with Great Britain, which provided a legal basis for German naval rearmament; the treaty specified that Germany would be able to build five  "treaty cruisers". The Admiral Hippers were nominally within the 10,000-ton limit, though they significantly exceeded the figure.

Admiral Hipper was powered by three sets of geared steam turbines, which were supplied with steam by twelve ultra-high pressure oil-fired boilers. As designed, her standard complement consisted of 42 officers and 1,340 enlisted men.

Admiral Hippers primary armament was eight  SK L/60 guns mounted in four twin gun turrets, placed in superfiring pairs forward and aft. Her anti-aircraft battery consisted of twelve  L/65 guns, twelve  guns, and eight  guns. She had four triple  torpedo launchers, all on the main deck next to the four range finders for the anti-aircraft guns.

The ship was equipped with three Arado Ar 196 seaplanes and one catapult.

Service history 

Admiral Hipper was ordered by the Kriegsmarine from the Blohm & Voss shipyard in Hamburg. Her keel was laid on 6 July 1935, under construction number 501. The ship was launched on 6 February 1937, and was completed on 29 April 1939, the day she was commissioned into the German fleet. The Commander-in-Chief of the Kriegsmarine, Großadmiral (Grand Admiral) Erich Raeder, who had been Franz von Hipper's chief of staff during World War I, gave the christening speech and his wife Erika Raeder performed the christening. As built, the ship had a straight stem, though after her launch this was replaced with a clipper bow. A raked funnel cap was also installed.

Kapitän zur See (Captain at Sea) Hellmuth Heye was given command of the ship at her commissioning. After her commissioning in April 1939, Admiral Hipper steamed into the Baltic Sea to conduct training maneuvers. The ship also made port calls to various Baltic ports, including cities in Estonia and Sweden. In August, the ship conducted live fire drills in the Baltic. At the outbreak of World War II in September 1939, the ship was still conducting gunnery trials. She was briefly used to patrol the Baltic, but she did not see combat, and was quickly returned to training exercises. In November 1939, the ship returned to the Blohm & Voss dockyard for modifications; these included the replacement of the straight stem with a clipper bow and the installation of the funnel cap.

Sea trials in the Baltic resumed in January 1940, but severe ice restrained the ship to port. On 17 February, the Kriegsmarine pronounced the ship fully operational, and on the following day, Admiral Hipper began her first major wartime patrol  during Operation Nordmark. She joined the battleships Scharnhorst and Gneisenau and the destroyers Karl Galster and Wilhelm Heidkamp in a sortie into the North Sea off Bergen, Norway. A third destroyer, Wolfgang Zenker, was forced to turn back after sustaining damage from ice. The ships operated under the command of Admiral Wilhelm Marschall. The ships attempted to locate British merchant shipping, but failed and returned to port on 20 February.

Operation Weserübung 

Following her return from the North Sea sortie, Admiral Hipper was assigned to the forces tasked with the invasion of Norway, codenamed Operation Weserübung. The ship was assigned as the flagship of Group 2, along with the destroyers Paul Jakobi, Theodor Riedel, Friedrich Eckoldt, and Bruno Heinemann. KzS Heye was given command of Group 2 during the operation. The five ships carried a total of 1,700 Wehrmacht mountain troops, whose objective was the port of Trondheim; the ships loaded the troops in Cuxhaven. The ships steamed to the Schillig roadstead outside Wilhelmshaven, where they joined Group 1, consisting of ten destroyers, and the battleships Scharnhorst and Gneisenau, which were assigned to cover Groups 1 and 2. The ships steamed out of the roadstead at midnight on the night of 6–7 April.

While steaming off the Norwegian coast, Admiral Hipper was ordered to divert course to locate the destroyer Bernd von Arnim, which had fallen behind Group 1. In the mist, the destroyer encountered the British destroyer ; the two destroyers engaged each other until Bernd von Arnims commander requested assistance from Admiral Hipper. Upon arriving on the scene, Admiral Hipper was initially misidentified by Glowworm to be a friendly vessel, which allowed the German ship to close the distance and fire first. Admiral Hipper rained fire on Glowworm, scoring several hits. Glowworm attempted to flee, but when it became apparent she could not break away from the pursuing cruiser, she turned toward Admiral Hipper and fired a spread of torpedoes, all of which missed. The British destroyer scored one hit on Admiral Hippers starboard bow before a rudder malfunction set the ship on a collision course with the German cruiser.

The collision with Glowworm tore off a  section of Admiral Hippers armored belt on the starboard side, as well as the ship's starboard torpedo launcher. Minor flooding caused a four degree list to starboard, though the ship was able to continue with the mission. Glowworms boilers exploded shortly after the collision, causing her to sink quickly. Forty survivors were picked up by the German ship. Admiral Hipper then resumed course toward Trondheim. The British destroyer had survived long enough to send a wireless message to the Royal Navy headquarters, which allowed the battlecruiser  time to move into position to engage Scharnhorst and Gneisenau, though the German battleships used their superior speed to break off contact.

One of Admiral Hipper'''s Arado seaplanes had to make an emergency landing in Eide, Norway, on 8 April. After trying to purchase fuel from locals, the aircrew were detained and handed over to the police. The Royal Norwegian Navy Air Service captured the Arado, which was painted in Norwegian colors and used by the Norwegians until 18 April when it was evacuated to Britain.

After arriving off Trondheim, Admiral Hipper successfully passed herself off as a British warship long enough to steam past the Norwegian coastal artillery batteries. The ship entered the harbor and docked shortly before 05:30 to debark the mountain troops. After the ground troops seized control of the coastal batteries, the ship left Trondheim, bound for Germany. She was escorted by Friedrich Eckoldt; she reached Wilhelmshaven on 12 April, and went into drydock. The dockyard workers discovered the ship had been damaged more severely by the collision with Glowworm than had previously been thought. Nevertheless, repairs were completed in the span of two weeks.

 Operation Juno 

Marschall organized a mission to seize Harstad in Northern Norway in early June 1940; Admiral Hipper, the battleships Scharnhorst and Gneisenau, and four destroyers were tasked with the operation. The ships departed from Kiel on 4 June. Three days later, Admiral Hipper and the four destroyers refueled from the supply ship Dithmarschen. The plan was to attack the British base at Harstadt in the morning of 9 June, but shortly after midnight of 8 June the plan was changed: a reconnaissance plan reported that there are no ships in Harstadt and since the German ships also detected highly increased convoy radio transmissions, Marschall deduced that the British are evacuating Harstadt. Instead of raiding Harstadt, Marschall decided to operate against the evacuation convoy.

While in search of the convoy, the German force first encountered the tanker Oil Pioneer at 06:45 on 8 June, which was escorted by the trawler HMT Juniper. Admiral Hipper sank Juniper with gunfire and Gneisenau sank Oil Pioneer. At 10:52, Admiral Hipper encountered and sank the empty troopship Orama. Despite launching their Ar 196 reconnaissance planes, the German ships failed to find the convoy, and at 13:00, Admiral Hipper and the four destroyers returned to Trondheim to cover and protect the German forces there, whilst the battleships refuel from the Dithmarschen and continue the operation.

On 10 June, Admiral Hipper and Gneisenau left Trondheim with the four destroyers in a second attempt to attack evacuating convoys but they returned to Trondheim the next day, having failed to locate any British vessels. On 13 June, the ship's anti-aircraft gunners shot down an attacking British bomber. On 25 July, Admiral Hipper steamed out on a commerce raiding patrol in the area between Spitzbergen and Tromsø; the cruise lasted until 9 August. While on the patrol, Admiral Hipper encountered the Finnish freighter Ester Thorden, which was found to be carrying  of gold. The ship was seized and sent to occupied Norway with a prize crew.

 Atlantic operations Admiral Hipper was ordered to leave the Norwegian theater on 5 August 1940 for an overhaul in Wilhelmshaven. This was completed on 9 September and with a new commanding officer, Wilhelm Meisel, the cruiser made ready to participate in Operation Sea Lion, the planned invasion of the United Kingdom. Admiral Hipper's role would have been a diversionary foray into the North Sea, Operation Herbstreise or "Autumn Journey", with the aim of luring the British Home Fleet away from the intended invasion routes in the English Channel. Following the postponement of that operation, on 24 September the ship left Wilhelmshaven on a mission break out into the Atlantic Ocean to raid merchant traffic. The engine oil feed system caught fire and was severely damaged. The fire forced the crew to shut down the ship's propulsion system until the blaze could be brought under control; this rendered Admiral Hipper motionless for several hours on the open sea. British reconnaissance failed to locate the ship, and after the fire was extinguished, the ship returned to Hamburg's Blohm & Voss shipyard, where repairs lasted slightly over a week.

The ship made a second attempt to break out into the Atlantic that was designated Operation Nordseetour on 30 November; she successfully navigated the Denmark Strait undetected on 6 December. Five of the twenty ships were allocated to Operation Excess. Admiral Hipper did not initially spot the escorting warships, and so began attacking the convoy. With her main guns she badly damaged two ships, one of which was the  transport Empire Trooper, before spotting the heavy cruiser Berwick and destroyers steaming toward her. She quickly withdrew, using her main guns to keep the destroyers at bay.

Ten minutes later, Berwick reappeared off Admiral Hippers port bow; the German cruiser fired several salvos from her forward turrets and scored hits on the British cruiser's rear turrets, waterline, and forward superstructure. Admiral Hipper then disengaged, to prevent the British destroyers from closing to launch a torpedo attack. By now, the ship was running low on fuel, and so she put into Brest in occupied France on 27 December. While en route, Admiral Hipper encountered and sank the isolated  passenger ship . Another round of routine maintenance work was effected while the ship was in Brest, readying her for another sortie into the Atlantic shipping lanes.

On 1 February 1941, Admiral Hipper embarked on her second Atlantic sortie. The Kriegsmarine had initially sought to send the battleships Scharnhorst and Gneisenau to operate in concert with Admiral Hipper, but Gneisenau suffered storm damage in December that prevented the participation of the two ships. Repairs were effected quickly, however, and the two battleships broke out into the Atlantic in early February. Admiral Hipper rendezvoused with a tanker off the Azores to top up her fuel tanks. Upon learning that the British Force H had sortied from Gibraltar deep into the Mediterranean, Meisel understood that the convoys between the UK, Gibraltar and West Africa were left uncovered with heavy units and he decided to operate on these shipping lanes.

On 11 February, the ship encountered and sank an isolated transport from convoy HG 53, which had been dispersed by U-boat and Luftwaffe attacks. That evening, she picked up the unescorted convoy SLS 64, which contained nineteen merchant ships. The following morning, Admiral Hipper closed in and sank several of the ships. The British reported only seven ships were lost, totaling , along with damage to two more. The Germans claimed Admiral Hipper had sunk thirteen of the nineteen freighters, while some survivors reported fourteen ships of the convoy were sunk. Admiral Hipper fired all of her 12 torpedoes and claimed all torpedoes had hit.

Following the attack on convoy SLS 64, Admiral Hippers fuel stocks were running low. She therefore returned to Brest on 15 February. Since the bigger dry docks had to be kept free for the eventual return of Scharnhorst and Gneisenau, Admiral Hipper was docked in a smaller one, but when moving into that dock she damaged her starboard screw on uncharted wreckage. A spare screw had to be transferred from Kiel and this caused additional delay. British bombers were regularly attacking the port, however, and the Kriegsmarine therefore decided Admiral Hipper should return to Germany, where she could be better protected. On 15 March, the ship slipped out of Brest, unobserved, and steered to a rendezvous point South of Greenland with the tanker Thorn. The refueling was delayed to 21 March because of bad weather. Since the heavy cruiser Admiral Scheer was also returning from a raid to Germany around the same time, there was a concern the two ships might hinder each other so Admiral Hipper got orders to make the breakthrough via the Denmark Strait before 28 March. She managed to do so on the 24 March. and two days later stopped to refuel in Bergen. By 28 March, the cruiser was docked in Kiel, having made the entire journey without being detected by the British. Upon arrival, the ship went into the Deutsche Werke shipyard for an extensive overhaul, which lasted for seven months. After completion of the refit, Admiral Hipper conducted sea trials in the Baltic before putting into Gotenhafen on 21 December for some minor refitting. In January 1942, the ship had her steam turbines overhauled at the Blohm & Voss shipyard; a degaussing coil was fitted to the ship's hull during this overhaul. By March, the ship was again fully operational.

 Deployment to Norway 

Several British submarines were patrolling the area, but failed to intercept the German flotilla. Admiral Hipper and her escorts reached their destination on 21 March.

Admiral Hipper, Tirpitz, and six destroyers sortied from Trondheim, while a second task force consisting of Lützow, Admiral Scheer, and six destroyers operated out of Narvik. Lützow and three of the destroyers struck uncharted rocks while en route to the rendezvous and had to return to port. Swedish intelligence had meanwhile reported the German departures to the British Admiralty, which ordered the convoy to disperse. Aware that they had been detected, the Germans aborted the operation and turned over the attack to U-boats and the Luftwaffe. The scattered vessels could no longer be protected by the convoy escorts, and the Germans sank 21 of the 34 isolated transports.

When the Admiral Hipper moved together with the Admiral Scheer and the light cruiser  to the Altafjord on 10 September in preparation for Operation Doppelschlag, the ships were unsuccessfully attacked by the British submarine . This operation was also aborted, because Hitler did not want to risk losses to the surface fleet.

After her return to port, Admiral Hipper was transferred to Bogen Bay near Narvik for repairs to her propulsion system. 

On 28–29 October, Admiral Hipper and the destroyers Friedrich Eckoldt and Richard Beitzen were transferred further north from Narvik to the Altafjord. Vizeadmiral Oskar Kummetz commanded the squadron from Admiral Hipper. On 7 November, the cruiser's Arado Ar 196 floatplane located the  Soviet tanker Donbass and its escort, the auxiliary warship BO-78. Kummetz dispatched the destroyer Z27 to sink the two Soviet ships.

 Battle of the Barents Sea 

In December 1942, convoy traffic to the Soviet Union resumed. Großadmiral Raeder ordered a plan, Operation Regenbogen, to use the available surface units in Norway to launch an attack on the convoys. The first convoy of the month, JW 51A, passed to the Soviet Union without incident. Raeder ordered the forces assigned to Operation Regenbogen into action. Admiral Hipper, again served as Kummetz's flagship; the squadron comprised Lützow and the destroyers Friederich Eckoldt, Richard Beitzen, Theodor Riedel, Z29, Z30, and Z31. The force left Altafjord at 18:00 on 30 December, under orders to avoid confrontation with even an equal opponent.

Kummetz's plan was to divide his force in half; he would take Admiral Hipper and three destroyers north of the convoy to attack it and draw away the escorts. Lützow and the remaining three destroyers would then attack the undefended convoy from the south. At 09:15 on the 31st, the British destroyer  spotted the three destroyers screening for Admiral Hipper; the Germans opened fire first. Four of the other five destroyers escorting the convoy rushed to join the fight, while  laid a smoke screen to cover the convoy. Kummetz then turned back north to draw the destroyers away. Captain Robert Sherbrooke, the British escort commander, left two destroyers to cover the convoy while he took the remaining four to pursue Admiral Hipper.

The cruisers engaged Admiral Hipper, which had been firing to port at the destroyer . Burnett's ships approached from Admiral Hippers starboard side and achieved complete surprise. In the initial series of salvos from the British cruisers, Admiral Hipper was hit three times. One of the hits damaged the ship's propulsion system; the No. 3 boiler filled with a mix of oil and water, which forced the crew to turn off the starboard turbine engine. The other two hits started a fire in her aircraft hangar. She fired a single salvo at the cruisers before turning toward them, her escorting destroyers screening her with smoke.

After emerging from the smoke screen, Admiral Hipper was again engaged by Burnett's cruisers. Owing to the uncertainty over the condition of his flagship and the ferocity of the British defense, Kummetz issued the following order at 10:37: "Break off action and retire to the west." Mistakenly identifying Sheffield as Admiral Hipper, the destroyer Friederich Eckoldt approached too closely and was sunk. Meanwhile, Lützow closed to within  of the convoy, but due to poor visibility, she held her fire. She then received Kummetz's order, and turned west to rendezvous with Admiral Hipper. Lützow inadvertently came alongside Sheffield and Jamaica, and after identifying them as hostile, engaged them. The British cruisers turned toward Lützow and came under fire from both German cruisers. Admiral Hippers firing was more accurate and quickly straddled Sheffield, though the British cruiser escaped unscathed. Burnett quickly decided to withdraw in the face of superior German firepower; his ships were armed with  guns, while Admiral Hipper and Lützow carried  and  guns, respectively.

Based on the order issued at the outset of the operation to avoid action with a force equal in strength to his own, poor visibility, and the damage to his flagship, Kummetz decided to abort the attack. In the course of the battle, the British destroyer Achates was sunk by the damage inflicted by Admiral Hipper. The Germans also sank the minesweeper  and damaged the destroyers , Obedient, and Obdurate. In return, the British sank Friederich Eckoldt and damaged Admiral Hipper, and forced the Germans to abandon the attack on the convoy. In the aftermath of the failed operation, a furious Hitler proclaimed that the Kriegsmarine's surface forces would be paid off and dismantled, and their guns used to reinforce the fortifications of the Atlantic Wall. Admiral Karl Dönitz, Raeder's successor, persuaded Hitler to retain the surface fleet, however. After returning to Altafjord, emergency repairs to Admiral Hipper were effected, which allowed her to return to Bogen Bay on 23 January 1943. That day, Admiral Hipper, Köln, and the destroyer Richard Beitzen left the Altafjord to return to Germany. The three ships stopped in Narvik on 25 January, and in Trondheim from 30 January to 2 February. After resuming the voyage south, the ships searched for Norwegian blockade runners in the Skagerrak on 6 February before putting into port at Kiel on 8 February. On 28 February, the ship was decommissioned in accordance with Hitler's decree.

 Fate 

Despite being decommissioned, repair work on the ship continued. The ship was moved in April to Pillau in the Baltic, to put Admiral Hipper out of the reach of Allied bombers. A year later, the ship was moved to Gotenhafen; the Kriegsmarine intended to re-commission the ship so she could be used in the Baltic. Over the next five months, Admiral Hipper ran a series of sea trials in the Baltic, but failed to reach operational status. As the Soviet army pushed the Germans back on the Eastern Front, her crew was drafted into construction work on the defenses of the city, further impairing Admiral Hippers ability to enter active service. The Royal Air Force also laid an extensive minefield around the port, which forced the ship to remain in the harbor.

By the end of 1944, the ship was due for another overhaul; work was to have lasted for three months. The Soviet Army had advanced so far, however, that it was necessary to move the ship farther away from the front, despite the fact that she had only one working turbine. On 29 January 1945, the ship left Gotenhafen with 1,377 refugees embarked. On the evening of the 30th, Admiral Hipper received a distress call from the sinking transport Wilhelm Gustloff, which was also carrying refugees. The cruiser did not stop to pick up survivors due to the threat of the submarine that sank Wilhelm Gustloff; it would instead become one of the worst maritime disasters in history. Admiral Hipper arrived in Kiel on 2 February and entered the Germaniawerft shipyard for refitting. On 3 May, RAF bombers attacked the harbor and severely damaged the ship. Her crew scuttled the wrecked ship at her moorings at 04:25 on 3 May. In July 1945, after the end of the war, Admiral Hipper'' was raised and towed to Heikendorfer Bay and subsequently broken up for scrap in 1948–1952. Her bell was on display at the National Maritime Museum in Greenwich. The bell has since been returned to Germany and is on display at the Laboe Naval Memorial near Kiel.

Footnotes

Notes

Citations

References

Further reading
 

Admiral Hipper-class cruisers
Ships built in Hamburg
1937 ships
World War II cruisers of Germany
Scuttled vessels of Germany
Maritime incidents in May 1945